Aphonoides is a genus of crickets in the subfamily Podoscirtinae and tribe Aphonoidini.  Most species records are from eastern Asia and Australasia, but some have been found in Africa and South America.

Species 
Aphonoides includes the following species:

Aphonoides acuta Ingrisch, 1997
Aphonoides aequatori Gorochov, 2007
Aphonoides agantra Otte & Alexander, 1983
Aphonoides albonotatus Chopard, 1954
Aphonoides amplus Gorochov, 2008
Aphonoides angustissimus Chopard, 1925
Aphonoides apiatus Saussure, 1878
Aphonoides australis Walker, 1869
Aphonoides berezini Gorochov, 2007
Aphonoides biangri Otte & Alexander, 1983
Aphonoides bicolor Chopard, 1951
Aphonoides bilineatus Chopard, 1954
Aphonoides binderi Otte & Alexander, 1983
Aphonoides bituberculatus Gorochov, 2008
Aphonoides catastictos Otte & Cowper, 2007
Aphonoides changi Gorochov, 2007
Aphonoides cinereus Haan, 1842
Aphonoides curtus Gorochov, 2008
Aphonoides cuspidatus Gorochov, 2008
Aphonoides debilis Chopard, 1925
Aphonoides depressiusculus Saussure, 1878
Aphonoides diadematus Bolívar, 1910
Aphonoides dohrni Gorochov, 2007
Aphonoides emeljanovi Gorochov, 2008
Aphonoides excavatus Gorochov, 2008
Aphonoides flexus Gorochov, 2008
Aphonoides frons Gorochov, 2008
Aphonoides gialai Gorochov, 2007
Aphonoides griseovariegatus Chopard, 1969
Aphonoides hackeri Chopard, 1951
Aphonoides hollowayi Gorochov, 2007
Aphonoides japonicus Shiraki, 1930
Aphonoides jimjimi Otte & Alexander, 1983
Aphonoides kadavu Otte & Cowper, 2007
Aphonoides kaikai Otte & Alexander, 1983
Aphonoides karnyi Chopard, 1940
Aphonoides karumbae Otte & Alexander, 1983
Aphonoides kerzhneri Gorochov, 2007
Aphonoides khaoyai Gorochov, 2007
Aphonoides lowanna Otte & Alexander, 1983
Aphonoides lunga Gorochov, 2008
Aphonoides marika Otte & Alexander, 1983
Aphonoides medvedevi Gorochov, 1985
Aphonoides miripara Otte & Alexander, 1983
Aphonoides morobe Gorochov, 2008
Aphonoides namalata Otte & Cowper, 2007
Aphonoides nepotinna Otte & Alexander, 1983
Aphonoides nicobarica Bhowmik, 1970
Aphonoides nok Gorochov, 2008
Aphonoides ocellaris Saussure, 1878
Aphonoides okapa Gorochov, 2008
Aphonoides orrori Gorochov, 2008
Aphonoides pallipes Chopard, 1929
Aphonoides papua Gorochov, 2008
Aphonoides paramplus Gorochov, 2008
Aphonoides peraki Gorochov, 2007
Aphonoides peristiges Otte & Cowper, 2007
Aphonoides phetchaburi Gorochov, 2007
Aphonoides popovi Gorochov, 2007
Aphonoides pubescens Chopard, 1940
Aphonoides punctatus (Haan, 1842) - type species (as Gryllus punctatus Haan - locality Tondano, Sulawesi)
Aphonoides rufescens Ichikawa, 2001
Aphonoides sabahi Gorochov, 2007
Aphonoides sarawaki Gorochov, 2007
Aphonoides sepik Gorochov, 2008
Aphonoides siami Gorochov, 2007
Aphonoides simplex Gorochov, 2008
Aphonoides siveci Gorochov, 2007
Aphonoides suvae Gorochov, 1986
Aphonoides taciturnus Saussure, 1878
Aphonoides tavuki Otte & Cowper, 2007
Aphonoides tawai Gorochov, 2007
Aphonoides tessellatus Chopard, 1969
Aphonoides vulgatus Gorochov, 2008
Aphonoides waigeo Gorochov, 2008
Aphonoides warratinna Otte & Alexander, 1983
Aphonoides weeronga Otte & Alexander, 1983
Aphonoides wuyiensis Yin & Zhang, 2001
Aphonoides xylurgos Otte & Cowper, 2007
Aphonoides yaeyamensis Oshiro, 1998

References

External links
 

Ensifera genera
crickets
Orthoptera of Asia